A carbon credit is a tradable certificate or permit representing the right to emit a set amount of carbon dioxide or the equivalent amount of a different greenhouse gas (tCO2e).

Carbon credits and carbon markets are a component of national and international attempts to mitigate the growth in concentrations of greenhouse gases (GHGs). One carbon credit is equal to one tonne of carbon dioxide, or in some markets, carbon dioxide equivalent gases. Carbon trading is an application of an emissions trading approach.  Greenhouse gas emissions are capped and then markets are used to allocate the emissions among the group of regulated sources.

The goal is to allow market mechanisms to drive industrial and commercial processes in the direction of low emissions or less carbon intensive approaches than those used when there is no cost to emitting carbon dioxide and other GHGs into the atmosphere. Since GHG mitigation projects generate credits, this approach can be used to finance carbon reduction schemes between trading partners around the world.

There are also many companies that sell carbon credits to commercial and individual customers who are interested in lowering their carbon footprint on a voluntary basis. These carbon offsetters purchase the credits from an investment fund or a carbon development company that has aggregated the credits from individual projects.  Buyers and sellers can also use an exchange platform to trade, which is like a stock exchange for carbon credits. The quality of the credits is based in part on the validation process and sophistication of the fund or development company that acted as the sponsor to the carbon project. This is reflected in their price; voluntary units typically have less value than the units sold through the rigorously validated Clean Development Mechanism. The European Union's carbon credits traded from $7.78 to $25.19 averaging $16.21 per tonne in 2018. Although it remains in development, it is anticipated that the value and trading of carbon credits will continue to grow particularly as several governments have committed to "green recoveries" following the COVID-19 pandemic recession.

Definitions
The Collins English Dictionary defines a carbon credit as “a certificate showing that a government or company has paid to have a certain amount of carbon dioxide removed from the environment”.
The Environment Protection Authority of Victoria defines a carbon credit as a “generic term to assign a value to a reduction or offset of greenhouse gas emissions.. usually equivalent to one tonne of carbon dioxide equivalent  (-e).”

The Investopedia Inc investment dictionary defines a carbon credit as a “permit that allows the holder to emit one ton of carbon dioxide”..which “can be traded in the international market at their current market price”.

Types
There are two types of credits. Voluntary emissions reduction (VER) is a carbon offset that is exchanged in the over-the-counter or voluntary market for credits. Certified emissions reduction (CER) relies on emission units (or credits) created through a regulatory framework with the purpose of offsetting a project's emissions.

Background
The burning of fossil fuels is a major source of greenhouse gas emissions, especially for power, cement, steel, textile, fertilizer and many other industries which rely on fossil fuels (coal, electricity derived from coal, natural gas and oil). The major greenhouse gases emitted by these industries are carbon dioxide, methane, nitrous oxide, hydrofluorocarbons (HFCs), etc., all of which increase the atmosphere's ability to trap infrared energy and thus affect the climate.

The concept of carbon credits came into existence as a result of increasing awareness of the need for controlling emissions. The IPCC (Intergovernmental Panel on Climate Change) has observed
that:
Policies that provide a real or implicit price of carbon could create incentives for producers and consumers to significantly invest in low-GHG products, technologies and processes. Such policies could include economic instruments, government funding and regulation,
while noting that a tradable permit system is one of the policy instruments that has been shown to be environmentally effective in the industrial sector, as long as there are reasonable levels of predictability over the initial allocation mechanism and long-term price.

The mechanism was formalized in the Kyoto Protocol, an international agreement between more than 170 countries, and the market mechanisms were agreed through the subsequent Marrakesh Accords.
The mechanism adopted was similar to the successful US Acid Rain Program to reduce some industrial pollutants.

Emission allowances 
Under the Kyoto Protocol, the 'caps' or quotas for Greenhouse gases for the developed Annex 1 countries are known as Assigned Amounts and are listed in Annex B. The quantity of the initial assigned amount is denominated in individual units, called Assigned amount units (AAUs), each of which represents an allowance to emit one tonne of carbon dioxide equivalent, and these are entered into the country's national registry.

In turn, these countries set quotas on the emissions of installations run by local business and other organizations, generically termed 'operators'. Countries manage this through their national registries, which are required to be validated and monitored for compliance by the UNFCCC. Each operator has an allowance of credits, where each unit gives the owner the right to emit one tonne of carbon dioxide or other equivalent greenhouse gas. Operators that have not used up their quotas can sell their unused allowances as carbon credits, while businesses that are about to exceed their quotas can buy the extra allowances as credits, privately or on the open market.
As demand for energy grows over time, the total emissions must still stay within the cap, but it allows industry some flexibility and predictability in its planning to accommodate this.

Since 2005, the Kyoto mechanism has been adopted for CO2 trading by all the countries within the European Union under its European Trading Scheme (EU ETS) with the European Commission as its validating authority. From 2008, EU participants must link with the other developed countries who ratified Annex I of the protocol, and trade the six most significant anthropogenic greenhouse gases.  In the United States, which has not ratified Kyoto, and Australia, whose ratification came into force in March 2008, similar schemes are being considered.

By permitting allowances to be bought and sold, an operator can seek out the most cost-effective way of reducing its emissions, either by investing in 'cleaner' machinery and practices or by purchasing emissions from another operator who already has excess 'capacity'. Through ETSs, the price of carbon is driven by emissions limits and the number of carbon allowances in circulation. These markets create a price for the impact of carbon emissions. ETS markets are regulated by governmental organizations and trading in these markets is tracked by the IHS Markit's Global Carbon Index, which provides a benchmark that track carbon credits future contracts globally. Investors participate in these markets by buying shares in highly specialized funds that buy an assortment of contracts to track index like The KraneShares Global Carbon ETF (KRBN).

Kyoto's 'Flexible mechanisms' 
A tradable credit can be an emissions allowance or an assigned amount unit which was originally allocated or auctioned by the national administrators of a Kyoto-compliant cap-and-trade scheme, or it can be an offset of emissions. Such offsetting and mitigating activities can occur in any developing country which has ratified the Kyoto Protocol, and has a national agreement in place to validate its carbon project through one of the UNFCCC's approved mechanisms. Once approved, these units are termed Certified Emission Reductions, or CERs. The Protocol allows these projects to be constructed and credited in advance of the Kyoto trading period.

The Kyoto Protocol provides for three mechanisms that enable countries or operators in developed countries to acquire greenhouse gas reduction credits
 Under Joint Implementation (JI) a developed country with relatively high costs of domestic greenhouse reduction would set up a project in another developed country.
 Under the Clean Development Mechanism (CDM) a developed country can 'sponsor' a greenhouse gas reduction project in a developing country where the cost of greenhouse gas reduction project activities is usually much lower, but the atmospheric effect is globally equivalent. The developed country would be given credits for meeting its emission reduction targets, while the developing country would receive the capital investment and clean technology or beneficial change in land use.
 Under International Emissions Trading (IET) countries can trade in the international carbon credit market to cover their shortfall in Assigned amount units. Countries with surplus units can sell them to countries that are exceeding their emission targets under Annex B of the Kyoto Protocol.

These carbon projects can be created by a national government or by an operator within the country.
In reality, most of the transactions are not performed by national governments directly, but by operators who have been set quotas by their country.

Emission markets 
For trading purposes, one allowance or CER is considered equivalent to one metric ton of CO2 emissions. These allowances can be sold privately or in the international market at the prevailing market price.  These trade and settle internationally and hence allow allowances to be transferred between countries. Each international transfer is validated by the UNFCCC. Each transfer of ownership within the European Union is additionally validated by the European Commission.

Climate exchanges have been established to provide a spot market in allowances, as well as futures and options market to help discover a market price and maintain liquidity. Carbon prices are normally quoted in Euros per tonne of carbon dioxide or its equivalent (CO2e). Other greenhouse gasses can also be traded, but are quoted as standard multiples of carbon dioxide with respect to their global warming potential.  These features reduce the quota's financial impact on business, while ensuring that the quotas are met at a national and international level.

Currently there are five exchanges trading in carbon allowances: the European Climate Exchange, NASDAQ OMX Commodities Europe, PowerNext, Commodity Exchange Bratislava and the European Energy Exchange.  NASDAQ OMX Commodities Europe listed a contract to trade offsets generated by a CDM carbon project called Certified Emission Reductions (CERs). Many companies now engage in emissions abatement, offsetting, and sequestration programs to generate credits that can be sold on one of the exchanges. At least one private electronic market has been established in 2008: CantorCO2e. Carbon credits at Commodity Exchange Bratislava are traded at special platform - Carbon place.

Managing emissions is one of the fastest-growing segments in financial services in the City of London with a market estimated to be worth about €30 billion in 2007. Louis Redshaw, head of environmental markets at Barclays Capital predicts that "Carbon will be the world's biggest commodity market, and it could become the world's biggest market overall."

Setting a market price for carbon 
Unchecked, energy use and hence emission levels are predicted to keep rising over time. Thus the number of companies needing to buy credits will increase, and the rules of supply and demand will push up the market price, encouraging more groups to undertake environmentally friendly activities that create carbon credits to sell.
 
An individual allowance, such as an Assigned amount unit (AAU) or its near-equivalent European Union Allowance (EUA), may have a different market value to an offset such as a CER.  This is due to the lack of a developed secondary market for CERs, a lack of homogeneity between projects which causes difficulty in pricing, as well as questions due to the principle of supplementarity and its lifetime.  Additionally, offsets generated by a carbon project under the Clean Development Mechanism are potentially limited in value because operators in the EU ETS are restricted as to what percentage of their allowance can be met through these flexible mechanisms.

Yale University economics professor William Nordhaus argues that the price of carbon needs to be high enough to motivate the changes in behavior and changes in economic production systems necessary to effectively limit emissions of greenhouse gases. Raising the price of carbon will achieve four goals. First, it will provide signals to consumers about what goods and services are high-carbon ones and should therefore be used more sparingly. Second, it will provide signals to producers about which inputs use more carbon (such as coal and oil) and which use less or none (such as natural gas or nuclear power), thereby inducing firms to substitute low-carbon inputs. Third, it will give market incentives for inventors and innovators to develop and introduce low-carbon products and processes that can replace the current generation of technologies. Fourth, and most important, a high carbon price will economize on the information that is required to do all three of these tasks. Through the market mechanism, a high carbon price will raise the price of products according to their carbon content. Ethical consumers today, hoping to minimize their “carbon footprint,” have little chance of making an accurate calculation of the relative carbon use in, say, driving 250 miles as compared with flying 250 miles. A harmonized carbon tax would raise the price of a good proportionately to exactly the amount of CO2 that is emitted in all the stages of production that are involved in producing that good. If 0.01 of a ton of carbon emissions results from the wheat growing and the milling and the trucking and the baking of a loaf of bread, then a tax of $30 per ton carbon will raise the price of bread by $0.30. The “carbon footprint” is automatically calculated by the price system. Consumers would still not know how much of the price is due to carbon emissions, but they could make their decisions confident that they are paying for the social cost of their carbon footprint.
Nordhaus has suggested, based on the social cost of carbon emissions, that an optimal price of carbon is around $30(US) per ton and will need to increase with inflation.The social cost of carbon is the additional damage caused by an additional ton of carbon emissions. ... The optimal carbon price, or optimal carbon tax, is the market price (or carbon tax) on carbon emissions that balances the incremental costs of reducing carbon emissions with the incremental benefits of reducing climate damages. ... [I]f a country wished to impose a carbon tax of $30 per ton of carbon, this would involve a tax on gasoline of about 9 cents per gallon. Similarly, the tax on coal-generated electricity would be about 1 cent per kWh, or 10 percent of the current retail price. At current levels of carbon emissions in the United States, a tax of $30 per ton of carbon would generate $50 billion of revenue per year.

Origins
It is widely accepted that the origins of carbon taxes and carbon credit payments are the Scandinavian countries, during the first decade of the UNEP's programs, which may be referenced with the Stockholm Environment Institute.

How buying carbon credits propose to reduce emissions

Carbon credits create a market for reducing greenhouse emissions by giving a monetary value to the cost of polluting the air. Emissions become an internal cost of doing business and are visible on the balance sheet alongside raw materials and other liabilities or assets.

For example, consider a business that owns a factory putting out 100,000 tonnes of greenhouse gas emissions in a year.  Its government is an Annex I country that enacts a law to limit the emissions that the business can produce. So the factory is given a quota of say 80,000 tonnes per year. The factory either reduces its emissions to 80,000 tonnes or is required to purchase carbon credits to offset the excess. After costing up alternatives the business may decide that it is uneconomical or infeasible to invest in new machinery for that year. Instead it may choose to buy carbon credits on the open market from organizations that have been approved as being able to sell legitimate carbon credits.

We should consider the impact of manufacturing alternative energy sources. For example, the energy consumed and the carbon emitted in the manufacture and transportation of a large wind turbine would prohibit a credit being issued for a predetermined period of time.

 One seller might be a company that will offer to offset emissions through a project in the developing world, such as recovering methane from a swine farm to feed a power station that previously would use fossil fuel. So although the factory continues to emit gases, it would pay another group to reduce the equivalent of 20,000 tonnes of carbon dioxide emissions from the atmosphere for that year.
 Another seller may have already invested in new low-emission machinery and have a surplus of allowances as a result. The factory could make up for its emissions by buying 20,000 tonnes of allowances from them. The cost of the seller's new machinery would be subsidized by the sale of allowances. Both the buyer and the seller would submit accounts for their emissions to prove that their allowances were met correctly.

Credits versus taxes 
Carbon credits and carbon taxes each have their advantages and disadvantages. Credits were chosen by the signatories to the Kyoto Protocol as an alternative to carbon taxes. A criticism of tax-raising schemes is that they are frequently not hypothecated, and so some or all of the taxation raised by a government would be applied based on what the particular nation's government deems most fitting.  However, some would argue that carbon trading is based around creating a lucrative artificial market, and, handled by free market enterprises as it is, carbon trading is not necessarily a focused or easily regulated solution.

By treating emissions as a market commodity some proponents insist it becomes easier for businesses to understand and manage their activities, while economists and traders can attempt to predict future pricing using market theories. Thus the main advantages of a tradeable carbon credit over a carbon tax are argued to be:
 the price may be more likely to be perceived as fair by those paying it.  Investors in credits may have more control over their own costs.
 the flexible mechanisms of the Kyoto Protocol help to ensure that all investment goes into genuine sustainable carbon reduction schemes through an internationally agreed validation process.
 some proponents state that if correctly implemented a target level of emission reductions may somehow be achieved with more certainty, while under a tax the actual emissions might vary over time.
 it may provide a framework for rewarding people or companies who plant trees or otherwise meet standards exclusively recognized as "green."

The advantages of a carbon tax are argued to be:
 possibly less complex, expensive, and time-consuming to implement.  This advantage is especially great when applied to markets like gasoline or home heating oil.
 perhaps some reduced risk of certain types of cheating, though under both credits and taxes, emissions must be verified.
 reduced incentives for companies to delay efficiency improvements prior to the establishment of the baseline if credits are distributed in proportion to past emissions.
 when credits are grandfathered, this puts new or growing companies at a disadvantage relative to more established companies.
 allows for more centralized handling of acquired gains
 worth of carbon is stabilized by government regulation rather than market fluctuations. Poor market conditions and weak investor interest have a lessened impact on taxation as opposed to carbon trading.

Creating carbon credits 

The principle of supplementarity within the Kyoto Protocol means that internal abatement of emissions should take precedence before a country buys in carbon credits. However it also established the Clean Development Mechanism as a Flexible Mechanism by which capped entities could develop measurable and permanent emissions reductions voluntarily in sectors outside the cap.  Many criticisms of carbon credits stem from the fact that establishing that an emission of CO2-equivalent greenhouse gas has truly been reduced involves a complex process.  This process has evolved as the concept of a carbon project has been refined over the past 10 years.

The first step in determining whether or not a carbon project has legitimately led to the reduction of measurable and permanent emissions is understanding the CDM methodology process.  This is the process by which project sponsors submit, through a Designated Operational Entity (DOE), their concepts for emissions reduction creation.  The CDM Executive Board, with the CDM Methodology Panel and their expert advisors, review each project and decide how and if they do indeed result in reductions that are additional

In recent years, software tools have been developed to aid in carbon credit creation, such as in relation to forest conservation, and solid waste or wastewater management.

Forests can be used to create credits, often involving the use of geospatial analytical systems to calculate the carbon offset of preserving an area forest or a reforestation initiative. REDD+ is one example of a forest carbon credit initiative. REDD+ carbon credits for individuals and businesses may be purchased through carbon offset retailers like Carbonfund.org Foundation or ACT4.io.

Additionality and its importance  

It is also important for any carbon credit (offset) to prove a concept called additionality. The concept of additionality addresses the question of whether the project would have happened in the absence of an intervention in the form of the price signal of carbon credits. Only projects with emissions below their baseline level, defined as emissions under a scenario without this price signal (holding all other factors constant), represent a net environmental benefit. Carbon projects that yield strong financial returns even in the absence of revenue from carbon credits; or that are compelled by regulations; or that represent common practice in an industry; are usually not considered additional. A full determination of additionality requires a careful investigation of proposed carbon offset projects.

It is generally agreed that voluntary carbon offset projects must demonstrate additionality to ensure the legitimacy of the environmental stewardship claims resulting from the retirement of carbon credits (offsets).

Carbon Capture, Utilization and Storage (CCUS) is increasingly being acknowledged as a critical component of limiting atmospheric CO2 sufficiently to reach the Paris Agreement goals of 2050. The International Energy Agency and the IPCC have both stated that, without CCUS, net zero goals are not possible to meet. While in its infancy as an offset product, CCUS-backed carbon sequestration has more potential than any other abatement measure to rapidly decarbonize industry. Virginia-based CarbonKerma is the first marketplace to introduce CCUS-backed carbon credit trading in the voluntary market.

As companies are under increasing pressure to make meaningful carbon offset investments under their ESG pledges or mandates, Carbon Capture technologies are expected to play an increasing role in ESG-project portfolios and offset programs.

Criticisms 

The Kyoto mechanism is the only internationally agreed mechanism for regulating carbon credit activities,  and crucially, includes checks for additionality and overall effectiveness. Its supporting organisation, the UNFCCC, is the only organisation with a global mandate on the overall effectiveness of emission control systems, although enforcement of decisions relies on national co-operation. The Kyoto trading period only applies for five years between 2008 and 2012. The first phase of the EU ETS system started before then, and is expected to continue in a third phase afterwards, and may co-ordinate with whatever is internationally agreed at but there is general uncertainty as to what will be agreed in Post–Kyoto Protocol negotiations on greenhouse gas emissions. As business investment often operates over decades, this adds risk and uncertainty to their plans. As several countries responsible for a large proportion of global emissions (notably USA, India, China) have avoided mandatory caps, this also means that businesses in capped countries may perceive themselves to be working at a competitive disadvantage against those in uncapped countries as they are now paying for their carbon costs directly.

A key concept behind the cap and trade system is that national quotas should be chosen to represent genuine and meaningful reductions in national output of emissions. Not only does this ensure that overall emissions are reduced but also that the costs of emissions trading are  carried fairly across all parties to the trading system. However, governments of capped countries may seek to unilaterally weaken their commitments, as evidenced by the 2006 and 2007 National Allocation Plans for several countries in the EU ETS, which were submitted late and then were initially rejected by the European Commission for being too lax.

A question has been raised over the grandfathering of allowances. Countries within the EU ETS have granted their incumbent businesses most or all of their allowances for free. This can sometimes be perceived as a protectionist obstacle to new entrants into their markets. There have also been accusations of power generators getting a 'windfall' profit by passing on these emissions 'charges' to their customers. As the EU ETS moves into its second phase and joins up with Kyoto, it seems likely that these problems will be reduced as more allowances will be auctioned.

Some sources show that the UK financial service wins a lot from carbon credit trade (which is designed to be profitable). The profit is evident if one checks the statistics: London has secured dominance on the global carbon trading market, with net value $64bn in 2007, according to the report by International Financial Services London. London controlled about 90% of the exchange market (Carbon credit vs money) in 2007. London-based companies made about 59% of the purchases of Carbon credits issued by the UN. And some of the carbon credit's system creators are from the UK, for example, the economist, former Senior Vice-president of the World Bank and government economic advisor in the United Kingdom Nicholas Stern, Baron Stern of Brentford who has founded a consultancy-trading agency "The Carbon Rating Agency (CRA)" on the Isle-of-Man (controlled by firm IDEAglobal Group where Stern was a Vice Chairman at that time) for carbon credit evaluation and rating.

While the carbon credit system can be an effective way to regulate carbon offsets by large institutions in large developed countries, it does not do enough to combat climate change in developing countries. Developing countries would be unlikely to adopt a carbon credit system to curve their emissions. These countries often prioritize economic growth and poverty alleviation over lowering their fossil fuel use and carbon emissions rate.

Fraud allegation
In 2019, a fraud trial began.  Eight men were accused of a £7m carbon credit fraud at Southwark Crown Court in England.  It was alleged that a fraud had been perpetrated on members of the public who were persuaded to make investments, including the purchase of carbon credits, which were 'effectively worthless'.  The trial collapsed because the judge ruled that the prosecution's expert witness 'did not have any relevant qualifications'.

See also

 Biochar production
 Cap and trade
 Carbon finance
 Carbon leakage
 Carbon offset
 Carbon project
 Carbon Trade Watch
 Emissions trading
 Emissions Reduction Currency System
 Energy speculation
 Flexible mechanisms
 Gold Standard (carbon offset standard)
 Kyoto Protocol emissions trading
 NORI token
 Priority Sector Lending Certificates
 Removal Units
 Tree credits
 Verified Carbon Standard

References

External links
 Carbon Finance International.
 1605(b)a US Voluntary Reporting Registry.
 What is Additionality? Part 1: A long standing problem, GHG Management Institute, Discussion Paper No. 001, (Jan 2012).

Carbon finance